Jin Guangzhu is a former Chinese footballer who played as a defender for the Chinese national football team.

Career statistics

Club

Notes

International

References

1968 births
Living people
Chinese footballers
China international footballers
Association football defenders
Yanbian Funde F.C. players
Guangzhou F.C. players
Asian Games silver medalists for China
Medalists at the 1994 Asian Games
Asian Games medalists in football
Footballers at the 1994 Asian Games